Saloon may refer to:

Buildings and businesses
 One of the bars in a traditional British pub
 An alternative name for a bar (establishment)
 Western saloon, a historical style of American bar
 The Saloon, a bar and music venue in San Francisco, California, US
 The Saloon (Minneapolis), a gay bar in Minneapolis, Minnesota, US
 A South Asian term for a barber's shop
 The centre room of a suite of state rooms, the drawing room

Automobiles
 Saloon (car), a style of car body also known as a sedan

Music
 Saloon (band), an English Indie musical group
 Saloon (album), by The Ongoing Concept

Ships
 A social lounge on a passenger ship
 The officers' mess on a merchant vessel
 The main social cabin of a yacht

See also 
 Salon (disambiguation)